The men's shot put athletics events for the 2012 Summer Paralympics took place at the London Olympic Stadium from 31 August to 8 September 2012. A total of 11 events were contested incorporating 19 different classifications.

Schedule

Results

F11–12

F20

F32–33

F34

F37–38

F40

F42–44

F46

F52–53

F54–56

F57–58

References

Athletics at the 2012 Summer Paralympics
2012 in men's athletics